Baby Makin' Music is the thirtieth studio album by the American Ohio musical soul group, the Isley Brothers (with bandleader Ronald Isley credited as the lead feature). It was released on the short-lived Def Soul Classics imprint on May 9, 2006. Their first for the Def Jam-affiliated label, the album peaked at number five on the Billboard 200, while debuting at number one on the Top R&B/Hip-Hop Albums chart. Album sales were helped by the R&B chart success of the first single, "Just Came Here to Chill", and the R. Kelly duet, "Blast Off", which is the only collaboration with Kelly on this album, after he produced their last album, Body Kiss (2003). Other producers on Baby Makin' Music include Gordon Chambers, Jermaine Dupri, Tim & Bob and Manuel Seal.

Track listing

Notes
  denotes co-producer
Sample credits
"You're My Star" contains samples from "Makings of You" as recorded by Gladys Knight & the Pips, written by Curtis Mayfield.

Personnel

Ronald Isley – lead and backing vocals, production, executive producer
Ernie Isley – acoustic guitar (track 1), electric guitar (tracks 5, 10)
R. Kelly – lead and backing vocals (track 2), arrangements, producer
Donnie Lyle – guitar (track 2)
Big D – guitar (track 10)
Bob Robinson – additional keyboards (tracks 1, 5), arrangements, production
Rodney East – additional keyboards (tracks 2)
Tim Kelley – bass, keyboards & drums (tracks 1, 5), backing vocals (track 5), arrangements, production

Jermaine Dupri – rapping, producer
Manuel Seal – multi-instruments & backing vocals (tracks 7, 8), production
Troy Taylor – multi-instruments, arrangements, production (tracks 3, 10, 11)
Johnta Austin – backing vocals (tracks 4, 6, 9)
Kandy Isley – backing vocals (tracks 1, 5)
Ezekiel "Zeke" Lewis – production, backing vocals (tracks 10, 11)
Sam Salter – backing vocals (track 11)
Tyran "Ty Ty" Smith – executive producer

Charts

Weekly charts

Year-end charts

References

External links 
 The Isley Brothers - Baby Makin' Music (2006) album review by Andy Kellman, credits & releases at AllMusic
 The Isley Brothers - Baby Makin' Music (2006) album releases & credits at Discogs
 The Isley Brothers - Baby Makin' Music (2006) album to be listened as stream on Spotify

2006 albums
Albums produced by Tim & Bob
Albums produced by Bryan-Michael Cox
Albums produced by Jermaine Dupri
Albums produced by R. Kelly
Albums produced by Ronald Isley
Albums produced by Troy Taylor (record producer)
The Isley Brothers albums
Def Jam Recordings albums